is a railway station in Katsushika, Tokyo, Japan, operated by the private railway operator Keisei Electric Railway and Hokuso Railway.

Lines
Keisei Takasago Station is served by the following lines.
 Keisei Main Line
 Keisei Kanamachi Line
 Narita Sky Access Line
 Hokuso Line

Layout
There are two island platforms serving four tracks (Nos. 1–4) on the ground level and one elevated side platform (No. 5) for the Keisei Kanamachi Line. The elevated Kanamachi Line platform opened on 5 July 2010.

Platforms

History
It was renamed  on 26 June 1913, and became Keisei Takasago from 18 November 1931.

The Hokuso Railway opened on 31 March 1991, and the Narita Sky Access Line opened on 17 July 2010. On the same day in 2010, station numbering was introduced to all Keisei Line stations; Keisei Takasago was assigned station number KS10.

See also
 List of railway stations in Japan

References

External links

 Station map

Railway stations in Tokyo
Keisei Main Line
Railway stations in Japan opened in 1912